Mohammad Sohail (born 25 May 1988) is a Pakistani cricketer who plays for Hyderabad. He made his first-class debut on 26 October 2015 in the 2015–16 Quaid-e-Azam Trophy.

References

External links
 

1988 births
Living people
Pakistani cricketers
Hyderabad (Pakistan) cricketers
People from Mirpur Khas District